Popovka is a rural locality (a village) in Kusekeyevsky Selsoviet, Birsky District, Bashkortostan, Russia. The population was 33 as of 2010. There are 3 streets.

Geography 
Popovka is located 15 km northwest of Birsk (the district's administrative centre) by road. Shamsutdin is the nearest rural locality.

References 

Rural localities in Birsky District